Venus Peter is a 1989 British film directed by Ian Sellar and produced by Christopher Young for Young films. The film is an adaptation of the novel A Twelvemonth and a Day by Christopher Rush. It was screened in the Un Certain Regard section at the 1989 Cannes Film Festival. It was filmed on the Orkney Islands, in the North of Scotland. The film crew paid members of the Orkney community to act as extras in the film.

In 1999 Richard Mowe, curator of film at the National Museum of Scotland, chose the film as one of his top twenty Scottish films of the century.

Japanese rock band Venus Peter are named after the film.

Plot

The film is set on a western isle of Scotland in the 1950s and follows young Peter and his relationship in the mainly adult world of the fishing village and his relationship with the sea and fishing boats (foremost of which is Kirkcaldy-registered KY199). The most important relationship is between Peter and his fisherman grandfather.

Cast
 George Anton as Billy
 Louise Breslin as Leebie
 Juliet Cadzow as Princess Paloma
 Peter Caffrey as Father
 Sinéad Cusack as Miss Balsilbie
 Emma Dingwall as Jenny
 Ken Drury as Gowans
 Christopher Fairbank as Blind man
 Cecil Garson as Gollie
 David Hayman as Kinnear
 Sam Hayman as Baby Peter
 Scott Heddle as Peem
 Ray Jeffries as Bank manager
 Sheila Keith as Epp
 Mary MacLeod as Miss Sangster
 Ray McAnally as Grandpa
 Alex McAvoy as Beadle
 Robin McCaffrey as Georgina
 Julia McCarthy as Agnes
 Caroline Paterson as Mother
 Gordon R. Strachan as Peter
 Alan Tall as McCreevie
 Cameron Stout as Bystander
 Lorraine Buchan as Bystander
 Justin Kimmett as Little Boy

References

External links

 

1989 films
Scottish films
English-language Scottish films
Films set in Orkney
Films shot in Scotland
1980s English-language films